The men's parallel slalom competition of the FIS Snowboarding World Championships 2013 was held in Stoneham-et-Tewkesbury, Quebec on January 27, 2013. 53 athletes from 21 countries competed.

Medalists

Results

Qualification
Each participant takes one run on either of the courses. After the first run, only the top 32 are allowed a second run on the opposite course.

Elimination round

References

Parallel slalom, men's